Cuautinchán is a town and municipality in Puebla in south-eastern Mexico. The municipality covers an area of 136.50 km². As of 2010, the municipality had a total population of 9538. It is located northeast of Alpatlahuac and northwest of Tecali de Herrera and roughly 20 kilometers southeast of Puebla city.

References

Municipalities of Puebla